Charles James Knott (26 November 1914 – 27 February 2003) was an English first-class cricketer. Knott was a right-handed batsman who bowled right-arm off-break and right-arm medium pace.

Early life
Knott was born in Southampton and educated at Taunton's School, where he developed first as a footballer before turning to cricket. On leaving school he went into his father's fishmonger's business; his father, Charles Knott senior, was an important figure in Southampton during the 1930s, having built the Banister Court Stadium for greyhound racing and motor-cycle racing alongside the county cricket ground. Within a year or so of going into the business, Charles junior was in charge of the fishmonger's.

Despite his work for the family business, he found time for cricket on Wednesday and Saturday afternoons, and soon began to turn in excellent performances bowling medium-pace for Deanery, in the Southampton League. He also helped Phil Mead's son to operate the scoreboard at the County Ground.

Cricket career
Knott made his first-class debut for Hampshire in the 1938 County Championship against Kent. Knott represented Hampshire in 16 first-class matches before the Second World War and a further 150 from 1946 to 1954. Knott's final appearance for the county came in the 1954 County Championship against Kent at the County Ground, Southampton.

In his 266 matches for the county, Knott scored 1,023 runs at a batting average of 6.95, with a high score of 27. Knott's poor batting record was due to the fact he was primarily a bowler and as such batted as a tailender.
Employed as a bowler, Knott was a consistent bowler taking 647 wickets for the county at a bowling average of 23.53, with 44 five wicket hauls and 8 ten wicket hauls in a match, with best bowling figures of 8/26 against Cambridge University in 1951. The 1946 season was Knott's best with the ball, during which he took 122 wickets at an average of 18.47, with 12 five wicket hauls, 3 ten wicket hauls in a match and best figures of 7/36. It could be said that Knott never had a poor season with the ball, with him taking 100 wickets in a season in 1946, 1948, 1949 and 1950. In addition Knott took 57 catches in the field.

In addition to playing first-class matches for Hampshire, Knott also represented Marylebone Cricket Club, making his debut for the club in the 1951 season, during which he played twice for the club against Yorkshire and Surrey. Knott's final first-class match in 1957 came for the club in a match against Scotland at Mannofield Park. Knott took 19 wickets for the club at an average of 11.15, with two five wicket hauls and best figures of 8/38 against Scotland.

Knott also played first-class cricket for the Gentlemen in the Gentlemen v Players fixtures of 1946 and 1950, where he took 8 wickets at an average of 25.12, with one five wicket haul of 5/66 in the 1950 fixture. Knott also played single first-class matches for the Over 32s and the Rest of England.

Legacy
Knott died at Southampton, Hampshire on 27 February 2003. A housing estate near the old county ground at Southampton, built on the site of the speedway stadium, was named "Charles Knott Gardens", in tribute to both father and son.

References

External links

1914 births
2003 deaths
Cricketers from Southampton
English cricketers
Hampshire cricketers
Gentlemen cricketers
Marylebone Cricket Club cricketers
People in greyhound racing